The following are the association football events of the year 1897 throughout the world.

Events

February
Jules Rimet founds  Red Star Football Club in Paris.

National champions
Argentina: Lomas Athletic Club
Belgium: Racing Club Bruxelles
England: Aston Villa
France: Standard Athletic Club
Ireland: Glentoran
Scotland:
Scottish Cup: Rangers
Sweden: Örgryte IS

Clubs founded in 1897
Bristol City
Juventus
Northampton Town

International tournaments
1897 British Home Championship (February 20 – April 3, 1897)

Births
June 16 – Ber Groosjohan, Dutch footballer (died 1971)

References 

 
Association football by year